Goniometer may refer to:

Goniometer, an instrument that measures angles or allows an object to be rotated to a precise angular position
Positioning goniometer, a device used to rotate an object precisely about a fixed axis in space
Goniometer (audio), a device that displays the amount of stereo in a dual-channel signal
The Bellini–Tosi direction finder is also known as a radio goniometer